The 1890 season was the seventh season of regional competitive association football in Australia. The were two league competitions and two cup competitions fielded by Northern District British Football Association (Northern NSW) and the South British Football Soccer Association (New South Wales).

League competitions

Cup competitions

(Note: figures in parentheses display the club's competition record as winners/runners-up.)

See also
 Soccer in Australia

References

Seasons in Australian soccer
1890 in Australian sport
N
Australian soccer